Darcy Lyndon Taylor (born October 12, 1993) is an American softball player. She attended Jenks High School in Jenks, Oklahoma. She later attended the University of Arizona for one year, before transferring to Oklahoma State University–Stillwater. At both universities, she played on the school's respective college softball teams. In her senior year, Taylor led Oklahoma State softball to a berth in the 2016 NCAA Division I softball tournament regional finals, where they lost to Georgia, 6–0.

References

External links
 Oklahoma State bio
 Arizona bio

1993 births
American softball players
Softball players from Arizona
Arizona Wildcats softball players
Oklahoma State Cowgirls softball players
Living people
People from Jenks, Oklahoma